Hans Inge Hammarström (born 20 January 1948) is a Swedish former professional ice hockey left winger. He played six seasons in the National Hockey League (NHL) for the Toronto Maple Leafs and St. Louis Blues between 1973 and 1979. The rest of his career, which lasted from 1964 to 1982, was spent in the Swedish Division 1 and Elitserien, the top leagues at the time. Internationally Hammarström played for the Swedish national team at several tournaments, including the 1972 Winter Olympics and five World Championships. After retiring Hammarström worked as a scout.

Playing career
Hammarström played his first ice hockey games at the top national league level in 1963 for Timrå IK, at the age of 15. The 1968–69 season he left for Brynäs IF where he would win the Swedish Championship four times (1970, 1971, 1972 and later in 1980).

In 1973, Hammarström became the first player from Timrå IK ever to play in the NHL. Along with Börje Salming, he was also one of the first two Europeans to play with the Toronto Maple Leafs. Both Hammarström and Salming had to debunk the misconception among Canadians in the NHL of the "chicken Swede." An example came from Maple Leafs team owner Harold Ballard who once complained, "Hammarstrom could go into the corner with a dozen eggs in his pocket and not break one of them." He went on to spend five seasons with the Maple Leafs and two for the St. Louis Blues. He had been traded from the Maple Leafs to the Blues for Jerry Butler on 1 November 1977. His career ended in 1982, aged 35, after another three seasons with Brynäs IF.

Olympics
He competed as a member of the Sweden men's national ice hockey team at the 1972 Winter Olympics held in Japan.

After retirement
After his playing career ended, Hammarström began working as a European-based ice hockey scout, including a stint with Central Scouting. From 1990 to 2008, he was the chief European scout for the Philadelphia Flyers. He also worked with the Vancouver Canucks from 2008 to 2018.with the Vancouver Canucks.

Hammarström is credited with being the scout who pushed the hardest for Philadelphia to select Peter Forsberg with the sixth overall pick of the 1991 NHL Entry Draft. At the time, the pick was considered a surprise. Forsberg had been ranked considerably lower by The Hockey News in its 1991 Draft Preview, and most observers expected the player to be taken late in the first round or early in the second round of the draft.

Career statistics

Regular season and playoffs

International

References

External links
 
 

1948 births
Living people
Brynäs IF players
Ice hockey players at the 1972 Winter Olympics
Olympic ice hockey players of Sweden
People from Sundsvall
Philadelphia Flyers scouts
St. Louis Blues players
Sportspeople from Västernorrland County
Swedish ice hockey left wingers
Timrå IK players
Toronto Maple Leafs players
Vancouver Canucks scouts